
Strzelce County is a unit of territorial administration and local government (powiat) in Opole Voivodeship, south-western Poland. It came into being on January 1, 1999, as a result of the Polish local government reforms passed in 1998.

As of 2019 its total population is 74,460. The most populated towns are Strzelce Opolskie with 17,900 inhabitants, and Zawadzkie with 7,135 inhabitants.

Neighbouring counties
Strzelce County is bordered by Olesno County to the north, Lubliniec County to the north-east, Tarnowskie Góry County to the east, Gliwice County to the south-east, Kędzierzyn-Koźle County to the south, Krapkowice County to the west and Opole County to the north-west.

Administrative division
The county is subdivided into seven gminas (five urban-rural and two rural). These are listed in the following table, in descending order of population.

References

 
Strzelce